Jack Paraiso also known as Iko The Rainman, is an American Brazilian hip-hop artist from Boca Raton, Florida.

Career 
Iko The Rainman is known for wearing too many hat's, a writer, comedian, a videographer, and hip-hop artist. The Rainman's progressive style been considered to be part of new age hip-hop music. Iko has been making music since 2011 in South Florida, many of his early aspirations were driven from Eminem, D12 and The Wu-Tang Clan. The Rainman is recognized for the way he incorporates his love for pop culture in his music, with subtle and not so subtle references to videogames, comics, movies and anime. He claims his aim is to capture the hearts of gamers and nerds that would usually shy away from rap music. Iko's first solo project "Basement Musik" was released in August 2012 and followed by "Attack Of The Rainman" which was an experimental horror project that was released on Halloween of 2013. Attack of the Rainman was considered to be a breath of fresh air in hip hop with his unique perspective on storytelling and his take on Hardcore Hip Hop.

Operation 5:AM also referred to as "OP5TV" and "OP5", was created by Iko The Rainman, and represents his vision and symbol for friends his and entertainment.

Discography

Iko the Rainman

Operation 5:AM

Music videos

References 

1989 births
Living people
American male rappers
Rappers from Florida
Brazilian rappers
Southern hip hop musicians
21st-century American rappers
21st-century American male musicians